Boronia bella is a plant in the citrus family Rutaceae and is endemic to a mountain range near Many Peaks Queensland, Australia. It is an erect shrub with many branches, simple leaves and four-petalled flowers.

Description
The eight stamens are hairy and alternate in length with those opposite the petals shorter than those near a sepal.

Taxonomy and naming
Boronia bella was first formally described in 1999 by Marco F. Duretto and the description was published in the journal Austrobaileya. The specific epithet (bella) is a Latin word meaning "pretty", "lovely" or "fine".

Distribution and habitat
This boronia grows in woodland and forest but is only known from the Many Peaks Range where it grows in granitic soils.

Conservation
Boronia bella is classed as "least concern" under the Queensland Government Nature Conservation Act 1992.

References 

bella
Flora of Queensland
Plants described in 1999
Taxa named by Marco Duretto